The Andrew Crockett House, also known as the Crockett-Knox House, is a property in Brentwood, Tennessee, United States that was listed on the National Register of Historic Places (NRHP) in 1988.

It was built or has other significance in c. 1800, 1821, and c. 1847.  The house was built by Andrew Crockett, an early settler.  It includes Greek Revival architecture.

According to a 1988 study of Williamson County historical resources, the house was built by 1799 and was enlarged later (c. 1850).  Crockett received the  land grant from North Carolina for his Revolutionary War services.

This house is one of five log buildings built during 1798 to 1800, during the earliest settling of the area, which survive to today.  Others, also NRHP-listed, are: the William Ogilvie House, the David McEwen House, the Daniel McMahan House, and the William Boyd House.

References

Houses on the National Register of Historic Places in Tennessee
Houses in Williamson County, Tennessee
Greek Revival houses in Tennessee
Houses completed in 1800
National Register of Historic Places in Williamson County, Tennessee